The Stibadocerinae are a subfamily from the family Cylindrotomidae. These flies are closely related to true crane flies.

Genera
Stibadocera Enderlein, 1912
Stibadocerella Brunetti, 1918
Stibadocerina Alexander, 1929
Stibadocerodes Alexander, 1928

References

 

Nematocera subfamilies
Cylindrotomidae